The European Pathway Association (E-P-A.org) is a European non-profit organisation which brings together researchers, managers and clinicians on the management concept of clinical pathways. The organisation works on the establishment of clinical care pathways in order to systematically plan and follow up a patient focused care program.

History
In 2003, at the conference of the International Society for Quality in Healthcare (ISQUA) in Dallas (United States), the idea of a European Pathway Association was suggested by Kris Vanhaecht of the Katholieke Universiteit Leuven (Belgium) and Massimiliano Panella of the University of Eastern Piedmont (Italy). On 16 and 17 September 2004, the EPA was founded at a meeting in Jesi (Italy).

See also
 European Institute for Health Records

References
 Darer J, Pronovost P, Bass E. Use and evaluation of critical pathways in hospitals. Eff Clin Pract 2002; 5:114-119.
 De Luc K., Developing care pathways - the handbook, Oxford: Radcliffe Medical Press Ltd, 2001.
 Vanhaecht K, Bollmann M, Bower K, Gallagher C, Gardini A, Guezo J et al., International survey on the use and dissemination of clinical pathways in 23 countries, Journal of Integrated Care Pathways, 2006.

External links
 European Pathway Association

International medical associations of Europe
Health in Europe
Organizations established in 2004